James Joseph Hope-Vere of Craigiehall MP FRSE (1785–1843) was a 19th-century Scottish landowner and politician. As a politician he was deemed a moderate Whig.

Life

He was born on 3 June 1785 the first surviving son of William Hope-Vere (1736–1811) and his wife, Sophia Corrie of Dumfries. His paternal grandfather was Charles Hope-Weir MP (1710–1791). He studied law at St John's College, Cambridge from 1801 and entered Lincoln's Inn to train as a barrister. He was called to the bar in 1820 but never practised. At Cambridge he and George Pryme became lifelong friends.

In 1811, on the death of his father, he inherited the Craigiehall estate near Linlithgow and the Blackhall estate near Lanark, totalling 8000 acres in all. He employed the Edinburgh architect Thomas Brown to extend the house but did not execute his plans. In 1828 new plans were drawn by William Burn for a north wing and this time were carried out.

From 1823 he corresponded with the historian John Philip Wood.

In 1829 he was elected a Fellow of the Royal Society of Edinburgh. His proposer was Thomas Allan. However, he does not appear to have made any active contributions to the society.

Ilchester is typically remote from his own home and reflects a long-standing disconnection between members of parliament and the constituents whom they represent. In the 1831 election he stood unopposed for the seat at  but (partly due to his physical absence, was wrongly recorded in the Returns as John James Hope. There is no record of him ever going to either Ilchester or Newport, but that was not a requirement of the day.

He died at his house on Park Lane in Mayfair in London on 19 May 1843.

Family
In 1813 he married Lady Elizabeth Hay (1794–1868), daughter of Sir George Hay, 7th Marquess of Tweeddale. They had six daughters before finally having two sons.

His eldest son, William Edward Hope-Vere (1824–1872) inherited his various Scottish estates. The younger son, Charles Hope-Vere (1828–1900) inherited £8000, a considerable sum at that time. William married Lady Mary Emily Boyle, daughter of Charles Boyle, Viscount Dungarvan. Charles married Julia Craigie-Halkett, daughter of Major General John Craigie-Halkett.

His sister-in-law, Elizabeth's sister Julia Hay, married the radical John Cam Hobhouse. His daughter Harriet Hope-Vere married Sir Edward Gooch.

He was cousin to Charles Hope, Lord Granton.

References

1785 births
1843 deaths
People from West Lothian
Alumni of the University of Cambridge
Members of Parliament for Newport (Isle of Wight)
British landowners
Fellows of the Royal Society of Edinburgh
Tory MPs (pre-1834)
UK MPs 1830–1831
UK MPs 1831–1832
Whig (British political party) MPs for English constituencies
19th-century British businesspeople